Jim Carlson may refer to:

 Jim Carlson (screenwriter) (1932–2007), American film and television writer
 Jim Carlson (Minnesota politician) (born 1947), Minnesota politician and member of the Minnesota Senate
 Jim Carlson (businessman), American businessman and the 2012 Grassroots Party nominee for President of the United States